The Faculty of Political Science, Thammasat University is an academic faculty of Thammasat University, Ministry of Education of Thailand. The Faculty of Political Science is one of the four founding faculties of the university. It was founded in 1949 after the Faculty of Law and the Thammasat Business School. It is the second oldest school of political science in Thailand after the Faculty of Political Science, Chulalongkorn University.

History
Thammasat University was founded on 27 June 1935 as "The University of Moral and Political Sciences". It mandated political science as a core undergraduate subject. The MA and PhD programs had three clearly separated tracks: political science, law, economics. The Faculty of Political Science was founded on 14 June 1949.

Campuses
The Faculty of Political Science teaches at two campuses: the Tha Phra Chan (Phra Nakhon District) campus in central Bangkok, and the Rangsit campus in the northern Bangkok Metropolitan Region.

Programmes 
The Faculty of Political Science offers three programmes in Thai at the Rangsit Campus, Pathum Thani. International (English) programmes are at the Tha Phra Chan campus.

International partner universities 
The International Programme of the Faculty of Political Science offers a wide range of overseas study opportunities to students, closely working with 23 partner universities in Asia, Europe, and North America.

References

External links
 Thammasat University
 Faculty of Political Science, Thammasat University

Thammasat University
Political science in Thailand
Political science education